The Doctors Secret may refer to:
 The Doctor's Secret (1909 film), a French silent short film
 The Doctor's Secret (1913 film), an American silent short film
 The Doctor's Secret (1929 film), an American drama film
 The Doctor's Secret (1930 film), a Swedish-language drama film
 The Doctor's Secret (1931 film), an American drama film
 The Doctor's Secret (1955 film), an Austrian drama film